John Dugan may refer to:

 John Dugan (actor), American actor
 John C. Dugan, Comptroller of the Currency for the United States Department of the Treasury
 John T. Dugan (1920–1994), American screenwriter
 John Dugan (soccer), retired American soccer player and coach

See also
 John Duggan (disambiguation)